The National Women's Invitational Tournament (NWIT) was a post-season tournament for women's intercollegiate basketball programs that was contested from 1969 to 1996.  The original sponsorship information appears to have been lost over the ensuing years.  After the NWIT folded in 1996, the concept was resurrected in 1998 by Triple Crown Sports under the same name, but the name was changed the following season to the Women's National Invitation Tournament (also known as the WNIT).

Format
Begun in the same year as the Commission on Intercollegiate Athletics for Women's invitational tournament (which was assumed by the now-defunct Association for Intercollegiate Athletics for Women in 1972), the NWIT was an eight team, consolation bracket tournament held at the Amarillo Civic Center in Amarillo, Texas. Through 1974, the tournament included teams from both four-year colleges and junior colleges.

Championship history
Source: 

*Overtime

See also
 NCAA Women's Division I Basketball Championship
 NCAA Women's Division II Basketball Championship
 NCAA Women's Division III Basketball Championship
 Women's National Invitation Tournament
 Women's Basketball Invitational
 NAIA Women's Basketball Championships
 AIAW women's basketball tournament

References

Postseason college basketball competitions in the United States
College women's basketball competitions in the United States
Recurring sporting events established in 1969